Nik Dodani (born December 19, 1993) is an American actor, writer, and comedian known for his roles as Zahid in the Netflix comedy-drama series Atypical, and Pat Patel in the revival of the popular CBS sitcom Murphy Brown.

He also starred in the 2019 thriller Escape Room and the 2021 film adaptation of Dear Evan Hansen. He made his Broadway debut as Ogie in Waitress from October 19 to November 27, 2021.

Career

Acting 
In addition to Netflix's Atypical and CBS's Murphy Brown, Dodani has appeared in Netflix's Trinkets, TBS's Angie Tribeca, Comedy Central's Idiotsitter, Freeform's Kevin from Work, and NBC's The Player. He also appeared in the Ben Stiller-produced Netflix film Alex Strangelove, Joshua Leonard's independent film Dark Was the Night opposite Marisa Tomei and Charlie Plummer, and the Sony Pictures thriller Escape Room.

Wendy's Commercial 
"EATS SPICY GOODNESS LIKE A BOSS"

In February 2020, he joined the cast of Hannah Marks' feature film Mark, Mary & Some Other People. In August 2020, he joined the cast of Stephen Chbosky's film adaptation of Broadway musical Dear Evan Hansen as Jared, who was re-conceived as "Jared Kalwani" to celebrate Dodani's casting. In March 2022, it was announced he would lead the New Line Cinema comedy The Parenting, opposite Brandon Flynn, Lisa Kudrow and Brian Cox.

Stand-up comedy 
Dodani made his late-night stand-up comedy debut on The Late Show with Stephen Colbert on September 28, 2018.

Writing and producing 
In October 2018, it was announced that Dodani will write the screenplay for the film adaptation of Rakesh Satyal's novel Blue Boy. In March 2022, Dodani launched his own production banner, Cosmic Pomegranate, with creative partner Joey Long.

In 2019, Dodani co-founded The Salon along with Bash Naran and Vinny Chhibber. The Salon is a forum for South Asian creatives in western creative arts. Dodani told The Hindu in 2021, "Our vision is to help the next generation of South Asian talent."

Political activities 
Dodani was active in organizing the South Asian community in support of the Joe Biden 2020 presidential campaign and in support of Kamala Harris. He also played an active role in organizing other entertainers for the Biden campaign as well as the Black Lives Matter movement.

During the 2016 presidential election, Dodani was a producer for MoveOn, where he organized a political comedy tour called Laughter Trumps Hate. He previously worked as a communications consultant at RALLY, an issue advocacy firm based in Hollywood, and as a graphic designer and student organizer on Elizabeth Warren's 2012 Senate campaign.

Personal life 
Dodani is of Indian descent and openly gay. He graduated from Basis Scottsdale in 2011 and studied politics at Occidental College in Los Angeles.

Filmography

Film

Television

References

External links 
 Nik Dodani Official site
 
Nik Dodani on Instagram

American male actors of Indian descent
American gay actors
Living people
Place of birth missing (living people)
Occidental College alumni
American LGBT screenwriters
American gay writers
American screenwriters
1993 births